Darcy's Story by Janet Aylmer was one of the first novels published after the success of the BBC One serial of Jane Austen's Pride and Prejudice in 1995.

Published in England in 1996, the novel tells the story from Mr. Darcy's point of view. In 2006, the novel was published by HarperCollins in the US. According to the author's website, over 150,000 copies of this book have been sold worldwide.

Author Janet Aylmer has since published a sequel, Dialogue with Darcy.

In all, Aylmer has written five novels and one non-fiction book about history in Bath linked with Jane Austen:

Darcy's Story (UK 1996, HarperCollins US 2006) – ISBNs 978-0-9528210-2-1 and 
The New Illustrated Darcy's Story (1999) – 
Walking with Jane Austen through Bath to Lyncombe and Widcombe (2003) – 
Julia & the Master of Morancourt (HarperCollins US 2009) – 
Sophie's Salvation (2015) – 
Dialogue with Darcy (2015) –

See also

 List of literary adaptations of Pride and Prejudice
 Pride and Prejudice, 1813 novel

References

External links
Darcy's Story at JanetAylmer.com

1996 British novels
Novels based on Pride and Prejudice